Covas is a surname. Notable people with the surname include:

 Bruno Covas (1980–2021), Brazilian lawyer, economist, and politician
 Mário Covas (1930–2001), Brazilian politician